Ranger was launched in 1774 in Virginia, possibly under another name. Between at least 1781 and 1786 she was the London transport Thames. Then from 1786 until 1794, she became the Hull-based whaler Ranger. She was wrecked in 1797.

Career
Unavailable issues and missing pages in issues available on line mean that Thames first appeared in Lloyd's Register in 1781.

In 1786 new owners renamed Thames Ranger, and sailed her as a whaler in the Greenland whale fishery.

Fate
In January 1797 Lloyd's List reported that Ranger, Potts, master, had run aground at Whitby while coming from Shields. It was expected that she would be lost.
 
Ranger was last listed in 1797 with data unchanged since 1794.

Citations

1774 ships
Ships built in Virginia
Age of Sail merchant ships
Whaling ships